North West England electrification schemes are a series of individual railway lines in North West England that have been, and continue to be electrified and upgraded. It is planned that these schemes will result in a modernised, cleaner, lower carbon and faster railway with improved capacity.

Earlier twentieth century schemes
The 1955 Modernisation plan for the railways of the United Kingdom called for the phase out of steam traction. Under this plan, parts of the railways in the northwest of England were electrified. Crewe to Manchester Piccadilly and the Styal Line were completed very early on in this plan. It also included the line from Crewe to Liverpool with Warrington Bank Quay, Wigan and Preston following in the early 1970s. There was a pause in electrification projects in the late 1960s when money ran out but then the West Coast Main Line north of Weaver Junction through the northwest of England to just south of Glasgow was electrified progressively between 1970-1974. The line from Preston to Blackpool was also proposed as a logical extension for electrification in conjunction with the Weaver Junction to Glasgow scheme in a document published by the British Railways Board in April 1968. No further 25 kV AC activity occurred in the northwest until after 2009. There were some 3rd rail infill schemes though. In 1956, British Rail adopted 25 kV AC OHLE as standard for most electrification projects. Some exceptions for 3rd rail extensions were allowed and confirmed by the ORR decades later. Parts of the northwest had already been electrified with the 3rd rail system. 

In 2007 Gordon Brown became Prime Minister and selected Andrew Adonis as Secretary of State for Transport. In 2009, Adonis in a government paper, put electrification back on the agenda and proposed infill electrification schemes in the North West of England as well as other railway electrification projects elsewhere. As of 2022, electrification in Northwest England is ongoing with civil engineering works such as bridge rebuilding taking place between Bolton and Wigan (17 total) and various other work is also in progress between Manchester Victoria and Stalybridge.

21st Century developments

The 2009 Adonis/DfT paper specifically stated that the work would commence immediately on the line between Liverpool and Manchester and a four-year time frame was given. The first phase of the northwest project was to be between Manchester and Newton-le-Willows. This would allow diesel trains running between Glasgow and Edinburgh to Manchester Airport to be replaced by electric trains throughout via the West Coast Main Line. Also reported in the paper was that the lines between Manchester and Preston and Liverpool and Preston were to be electrified. Work was announced as having started in the Manchester area in March 2011.

In July 2012 the Coalition government announced new electrification schemes, all at 25 kV AC and reconfirmed schemes previously announced by Adonis. These were: Electrification of the 'North West Triangle' (Manchester – Liverpool via Chat Moss, Huyton - Wigan, Manchester - Euxton Junction and Blackpool North – Preston); and part of the Northern Hub (New Ordsall Chord). The North West triangle project called for a major civil engineering project to rebore the Farnworth tunnel on the Manchester–Preston line in advance of electrification. 

However, the Hendy review moved the completion of GRIP 3 to March 2017 with a yet to be determined date for completion of electrification. However, the enhancements delivery plan update of September 2016 moved the completion date with only GRIP Stage 3 (Option selection) being completed by then. On 1 September 2021, the Department for Transport formally announced this would now go ahead.

In July 2017, Chris Grayling, the secretary of state for transport announced a number of electrification schemes were to be cancelled including the Lakes Line from Oxenholme to Windermere.

In February 2019 the final electric test train ran on the Preston to Manchester line in readiness for squadron electric service. In March 2019 the Railway Industry Association published a paper on Electrification cost challenge suggesting ways forward and a rolling program of electrification. In April 2019 the power was switched on from Manchester Victoria to Miles Platting. This section of line is now part of the Transpennine Route Upgrade though. Most of the schemes first planned in the 2010 timeframe are now complete.

From December 2021 onwards, Wigan to Bolton electrification and associated works is in progress. This will include Crow Nest Junction. This electrification scheme is claimed to also improve logistics and not have diesel trains running under the wires. The National Electrification Efficiency Panel (NEEP) is involved in this scheme. This panel was commissioned by the Department for Transport at the end of 2021. and chaired by Professor Andrew McNaughton. It is claimed the civil engineering costs have already been halved. As part of this schemes various bridges need to be completely demolished and rebuilt.

Future proposals
In September 2020 the TDNS Traction Decarbonisation Network Strategy Interim Business case was published but dated July 31, 2020. The principal recommendation was further electrification of 13,000km (single track kilometres) of UK railways. This document proposed a number of lines in the northwest for further electrification. Page 213 had a list of suggestions including Liverpool to Manchester via Warrington and Chester to Warrington - often called the Cheshire Lines Committee railway lines. No attempt was made to prioritise the schemes in this publication.

As part of the Transport for Greater Manchester's Delivery Plan, proposals have been put forward to electrify the line between Manchester Victoria and Rochdale via Mills Hill. This is part of the 2040 Strategy, and they aim to complete business cases for the early delivery of it with potential delivery in 2026, subject to funding.

Integration with other schemes
The Northern Hub and the Great North Rail Project are railway schemes across Northern England that include electrifying lines in the northwest. The original aim was to have series of upgrades that would reduce bottlenecks in the Manchester area. The scheme also  involved building and electrifying  the Ordsall Chord to connect Manchester Victoria and Piccadilly stations.

The Manchester to Stalybridge scheme was originally part of Northwest England Electrification schemes but is now part of Transpennine Route Upgrade.

In November 2021 the Integrated Rail Plan for the North and Midlands was published. This government document states HS2 will be built from Crewe to Manchester. and reduces HS2 to a high speed link from London via Birmingham to the north west of England just south of Wigan North Western railway station.  It is planned for Warrington to have a high speed link to a reopened Warrington Bank Quay low-level station. The HS2 track from the east will merge onto regular but upgraded track leaving the west side towards Liverpool. 

Northern Powerhouse Rail is also included in the plan. It involves building less high-speed rail than previously proposed. A link is introduced from HS2 to Liverpool via a section of new high speed line from reinstated low-level platforms at Warrington Bank Quay and onwards via upgraded sections to join the existing line to Liverpool Lime Street.

Summary of individual schemes
 Manchester to Newton-le-Willows - completed.
 Newton-le-Willows to Liverpool -completed.
 Liverpool-Wigan line -completed.
 Manchester-Preston-completed.
 Preston-Blackpool North-completed.
 Salford Crescent to Manchester Victoria-completed.
 Oxenholme to Windermere  - cancelled.
 Lostock Junction (Bolton area) to Wigan - in progress as of December 2021. 
 Manchester Victoria to Rochdale - proposed.

Gallery of photographs of Northwest England electrification

See also
 Campaign to Electrify Britain's Railway
 History of rail transport in Great Britain 1995 to date
 Integrated Rail Plan for the North and Midlands
 List of proposed railway electrification routes in Great Britain
 Midland Main Line railway upgrade
 Northern Hub
 Northern Powerhouse Rail
 Overhead line
 Railway electrification in Great Britain
 Railway electrification in Scotland
 Sankey Viaduct
 Transpennine Route Upgrade
 West Coast Main Line route modernisation
 21st-century modernisation of the Great Western Main Line

References

Further reading

External links
 Campaign to Electrify Britain's Railways Website
 Permanent Way Institution home page
  Great North Rail Project - Network Rail
 Northwest Sparks - Projects
 Electric All The Way – 1974 British Rail information booklet about the completion of electrification to Glasgow.
 Rail Industry web page which monitors the progress of the project
 Department of Transport – 2006 – West Coast Main Line – Update Report

North West England
Rail transport in England
Electrification
Railway upgrades in the United Kingdom